Tromeo and Juliet is a 1997 American independent transgressive romantic black comedy film and a loose adaptation of William Shakespeare's Romeo & Juliet from Troma Entertainment. The film was directed by Lloyd Kaufman, edited by Todd Field, from a screenplay by Kaufman and James Gunn, who also served as associate director.

The film is a loose adaptation of the play, as it includes the extreme amounts of sexuality and violence characteristic of Troma, as well as a revised ending. The film's title is a blend of "Troma" and "Romeo and Juliet".

Plot

Set in modern-day Manhattan, the film begins with the narrator (Lemmy of Motörhead) introducing two families: the rich Capulets and the poor Ques.

At the center of these families are Tromeo Que and Juliet Capulet. Tromeo lives in squalor with his poor father Monty and works at a tattoo parlor with his cousin Benny and friend Murray. Juliet is sequestered in her family's mansion, watched over by her abusive father Cappy, passive mother Ingrid, and overprotective cousin Tyrone, all the while being sexually satisfied by family servant Ness (Debbie Rochon).

Both Tromeo and Juliet are trapped in cases of unrequited love: Tromeo lusts for the big-bosomed, promiscuous Rosie; Juliet is engaged to wealthy meat tycoon London Arbuckle as prelude to an arranged marriage.

In the meantime, a bloody brawl between Murray and Sammy Capulet catches the attention of Detective Ernie Scalus, who gathers the heads of the two families together and declares that they will be held personally accountable for any further breaches of the peace. Almost immediately afterward, Monty and Cappy start threatening each other with weapons. Sammy gets caught in the window of Monty's speeding car, where he is thrown head-first into a fire hydrant and gradually dies.

On the insistence of Murray and Benny, Tromeo attends the Capulets' masquerade ball in the hopes of meeting Rosie, only to find another man performing cunnilingus on her. Tromeo staggers around the party in disillusion until he locks eyes with Juliet. The two instantly fall for each other and share a dance until an angry Tyrone chases him out of the house.

Tromeo and Juliet continue to be enamored by one another from afar. Cappy, disgusted at his daughter's active libido, forcefully imprisons her in a plastic cage as punishment. Eventually, Tromeo sneaks into the house of Capulet and the two meet once again. After proclaiming their love for each other both verbally and physically, they agree to be married. Juliet breaks her engagement with Arbuckle and, with the help of Father Lawrence, the two are married in secrecy the next day.

Tyrone, upon discovering Juliet's secret affair, gathers his gang together to find Tromeo in his family's parlor and accuse him of bridenapping. Now a kinsman to the Capulets, Tromeo reassures Tyrone that Juliet doesn't want Arbuckle as her husband anymore hence announcing a truce to both families. However, Tyrone refuses to believe him. Eventually, Murray stands by Tromeo's side to try and defend his honor, but is fatally wounded by Tyrone's club as an example for anyone, besides Arbuckle, who dares to seduce Juliet. Tromeo, enraged by his friend's death, pursues Tyrone, slays him (through a series of car crashes that dismember him), and goes into hiding. Learning from the late Tyrone that Juliet has already became Tromeo's wife, Cappy suggests to Detective Scalus that the Ques should be evicted from Manhattan permanently due to their crimes against his family, and the Detective agrees to ensure that Tyrone's sacrifice won't be in vain on behalf of the Capulet family. Later, Cappy savagely beats Juliet into reconciling with Arbuckle, threatening to disown her if she doesn't. With the help of Cappy, Arbuckle accepts her re-proposal and the wedding date is set. 

Eventually, Juliet goes into hiding with Father Lawrence, whom she recruited along with Tromeo, who was recently evicted from his home by Scalus along with the rest of his family. Together, the three devise a plan to clear the Que family name and end the Capulet/Que feud for good, enlisting the help of Fu Chang, the apothecary, who sells Juliet a special potion which will aid her predicament.

On the day of her wedding, Juliet drinks the apothecary's potion, transforming her into a hideous cow monster (complete with a three-foot penis). The mere sight of her causes Arbuckle to leap out of Juliet's window in fright, committing suicide in the process. Enraged over the loss of his would-be son-in-law and meat inheritance, Cappy deems Juliet a disgrace to the Capulet family and sentences her to death, but Tromeo arrives just in time to chase Cappy out of her room before he can rape her to death and bring Juliet's appearance back to normal by a single kiss. Meanwhile, Cappy was forced to retreat into the parlor to get his crossbow, and then returns to Juliet's room, ready to execute the newlyweds. Eventually, Juliet performs one last act of defiance against her father by electrocuting him to death with a computer monitor. After the Capulets' residence is successfully overtaken, Detective Scalus becomes impressed by Tromeo and Juliet's teamwork of ending Cappy's criminal empire, pardoning Tromeo of murder while ordering for Cappy's corpse to be transported by an ambulance to the morgue for cremation.

With Cappy's criminal empire finally defeated, Tromeo and Juliet embrace victoriously until they are stopped short by Ingrid and Monty, who reveals to them the real reason behind the Capulet/Que feud: Long ago, Cappy and Monty were the owners of the successful Silky Films production company. Ingrid, married to Monty at the time, struck up an affair with Cappy, eventually birthing a son which Monty raised as his own. Faced with a divorce from Ingrid and the threat of having his son taken away from him, Monty was forced to sign over all the rights of Silky Films to the Capulets in exchange for his son. After the initial shock at the revelation that they are siblings, Tromeo and Juliet brush it off as they are determined not to let their whole ordeal be for naught; they passionately embrace and drive off into the sunset.

The film picks up six years later in Tromaville, New Jersey, where Tromeo and Juliet, now married, have become suburban yuppies with a house and (birth defected/deformed) children of their own.

The film ends with the narrator's brief poem for the lovers: "And all of our hearts free to let all things base go/As taught by Juliet and her Tromeo". A brief shot of William Shakespeare laughing uproariously is shown before the end credits.

Cast
 

Lloyd Kaufman, Merle Allin and Ami James have non-speaking cameos in the film. A scene featuring Ron Jeremy as a homeless man was filmed but ultimately deleted from the final cut of the movie.

Production
The first draft of Tromeo and Juliet surfaced in 1992, written by Kaufman and Troma employees Andy Deemer and Phil Rivo, written entirely in Shakespearean verse and supposedly featuring The Toxic Avenger as a side character. The feedback from other Troma employees and Michael Herz was unanimously negative, so the idea was scrapped.

In 1995, another shot was taken at the concept, this time by newbie screenwriter James Gunn. Gunn completely rewrote the script, again in Shakespearean verse, making it darker and far more obscene; the original version had Juliet as a stripper and Tromeo as a crack dealer. Another revision, with additional material by Kaufman, was crafted into what the film eventually became: the verse was trimmed down and more comical elements were added.

Tromeo and Juliet was shot in the summer of 1995 for $350,000, one of the least expensive films in Troma history.

Director Lloyd Kaufman said that, in preparation for their sex scene, he gave Will Keenan and Jane Jensen time during pre-production to block the scene themselves. "I wanted them to develop a very intense relationship and indeed they did. But they decided that they shouldn't actually have off-screen intercourse until after the movie. I don't remember whether they ever did but this gave their on-screen scenes together terrific sexual tension and was something a sex-crazed pervert like me would never have thought of in a zillion years," Kaufman said."

Reception
The New York Times called the film "exhilarating", Variety described it as a "no-holds Bard" and USA Today noted the film was "not just for Troma junkies...Tromeo and Juliet is sexy, silly, sweet and surreal!". Tromeo also played in art house theatres in Los Angeles and New York for months, and reportedly played at a San Francisco theatre for over a year.

In addition, Tromeo was selected to play at the Cannes Film Festival, the Fantasporto festival, the Mar del Plata Film Festival and the Italian Fantafestival, where it won the award for Best Film of 1997.

Daniel Rosenthal describes Tromeo and Juliet as "the nadir of screen Shakespeare...[it] takes every major character and incident from Romeo and Juliet and systematically drains them of humanity in a tedious, appallingly acted feast of mutilation and softcore sex." Tony Howard summarizes it as a film "in which Juliet and the Nurse have lesbian sex, Romeo masturbates, various body parts are removed, the feud is between rival porn czars and incest rules".

Attempted follow-ups

After the success of Tromeo, Troma had plans to develop a spiritual sequel entitled Schlock and Schlockability (a play on Sense and Sensibility), in which Jane Austen is reincarnated as a well-endowed female who takes revenge on all of the Hollywood movie producers who have bastardized her novels. At one point, Troma announced that the film would head into production, but since then, there are no plans to follow up on the film.

Soundtrack

Tromeo and Juliet is also notable for its soundtrack, composed of alternative rock, pop punk and heavy metal music, which helped get the film some recognition on MTV. Most bands were willing to contribute their tracks for little to no money out of respect for Troma. In return for their song "Mr. Superlove", The Ass Ponys' lead singer requested only a check from the company for $9.95, for the purpose of framing it on his wall.

The CD soundtrack was released on Oglio Records on May 6, 1997, and included the following tracks:

"Tromeo and Juliet Theme" by Willie Wisely
"Sacrifice" by Motörhead
"Pope on a Rope" by The Meatmen
"Sunday" by The Icons
"The Capulet Song (My Name Is Capulet)" by Stephen Blackehart & Valentine Miele
"Drink That Whiskey" by The Wesley Willis Fiasco
"Hyper Enough" by Superchunk
"La Migra (Cruza La Frontera II)" by Brujeria
"Gizzards, Scrapple and Tripe" by The New Duncan Imperials
"Mr. Superlove" by Ass Ponys
"Math" by Supernova
"Romeo" by Sublime
"TV Show Theme" by Willie Wisely
"Monster Island" by Booterella w/ Jane Jensen
"Yes, We'll Gather at the River" by Willie Wisely, Sean Gunn, Valentine Miele, Patrick Connor
"Alleged" by Unsane

References

External links
 Troma Entertainment: Tromeo & Juliet
 
 

1996 films
Bisexuality-related films
Films based on Romeo and Juliet
Films directed by Lloyd Kaufman
Films set in New York City
Films with screenplays by James Gunn
Incest in film
Modern adaptations of works by William Shakespeare
Teensploitation
Troma Entertainment films
1990s English-language films